Walter Nathaniel Bowyer Jr. (born September 8, 1960) is a former American football defensive end who played four seasons with the Denver Broncos of the National Football League (NFL). He was drafted by the Broncos in the tenth round of the 1983 NFL Draft. He played college football at Arizona State University and attended Wilkinsburg High School in Wilkinsburg, Pennsylvania. Bowyer was also a member of the Edmonton Eskimos of the Canadian Football League (CFL).

References

External links
Just Sports Stats

Living people
1960 births
Players of American football from Pittsburgh
American football defensive ends
Canadian football defensive linemen
African-American players of American football
African-American players of Canadian football
Arizona State Sun Devils football players
Denver Broncos players
Edmonton Elks players
Players of Canadian football from Pittsburgh
21st-century African-American people
20th-century African-American sportspeople